Beata Handra (born January 3, 1977) is an American former competitive ice dancer. With partner and husband Charles Sinek, she is the 1999–2002 U.S. national pewter medalist and placed as high as fourth at the Four Continents Championships.

Personal life
Handra's father is a refugee from the Hungarian revolution in 1956 and her mother is a concert pianist from Japan. She attended the University of California at Berkeley before deciding to focus on skating. Handra and Sinek married in 1996. Their son, Kai Bela Sinek, was born on May 11, 2017.

Career 
Handra completed her senior test in 1991 with skating coaches Suzy Jackson and Paul Spruell when she lived in San Rafael, California. She skated as a solo dancer early in her career and came to the 1995 National Championships looking for a dance partner. Handra teamed up with Charles Sinek when she was 18 years old. In 2000, Handra/Sinek were given their first Grand Prix assignment, Skate America. Three weeks before the event, Sinek developed a staph infection after Handra accidentally cut his right shin in practice. He recovered and they competed at the event, placing sixth.

In the 2001–02 season, Handra/Sinek missed their two Grand Prix assignments due to health issues—in August 2001, Sinek underwent knee surgery which resulted in a blood clot in his calf, and tore his meniscus a second time in September 2001.

Handra/Sinek placed fourth at the 2002 U.S. Championships and were sent to the 2002 Four Continents Championships where they placed a career-best fourth. They were also granted the United States' second spot to the 2002 Winter Olympics because two teams who ranked above them nationally—Tanith Belbin / Benjamin Agosto and Melissa Gregory / Denis Petukhov—were ineligible for the Olympics due to citizenship problems. Handra/Sinek placed 23rd at the Olympics.

Programs 
(with Sinek)

Competitive highlights
(with Sinek)

References

External links
 

American female ice dancers
Figure skaters at the 2002 Winter Olympics
Olympic figure skaters of the United States
1977 births
Living people
Sportspeople from San Francisco
American people of Hungarian descent
American sportspeople of Japanese descent
21st-century American women